Ravendra Pal Singh is an Indian politician who is serving as Member of 18th Uttar Pradesh Legislative Assembly from Chharra Assembly constituency. In 2022 Uttar Pradesh Legislative Assembly election, he won with 1,11,293 votes.

References 

Living people
Uttar Pradesh MLAs 2022–2027
Year of birth missing (living people)